Sand Creek Township, Indiana may refer to one of the following places:

 Sand Creek Township, Bartholomew County, Indiana
 Sand Creek Township, Decatur County, Indiana
 Sand Creek Township, Jennings County, Indiana

See also

Sand Creek Township (disambiguation)
Salt Creek Township, Indiana (disambiguation)

Indiana township disambiguation pages